What a Whopper is a 1961 British comedy film directed by Gilbert Gunn. It was written by Terry Nation, from a story by Jeremy Lloyd and Trevor Peacock. Pop singer Adam Faith stars as a writer who travels with some friends to Scotland to fake a sighting of the Loch Ness Monster.

The cast includes Wilfrid Brambell as a local postman, Sid James, Charles Hawtrey and Terry Scott. The TV reporter Fyfe Robertson appears briefly as himself, covering the alleged sightings of the monster.

Plot
Struggling young writer Tony Blake (Adam Faith) is served an eviction notice by Mr Slate (Clive Dunn) from his rented room in a Chelsea house shared with other artistic types including abstract "flicking" painter Arnold (Charles Hawtrey). Tony hatches a plan to drum up interest in his rejected book on the Loch Ness Monster by faking a sighting of the creature. He and his friend Vernon (Terence Longdon), who makes electronic music, construct a phony monster, which they photograph in the Serpentine, startling a tramp (Spike Milligan). The two friends and Vernon's ditzy girlfriend Charlotte 'Charlie' Pinner (Carole Lesley) decide to visit Scotland to further their ruse. Driving in a second-hand Rolls-Royce hearse, they pick up a young French hitchhiker, Marie (Marie-France), along the way. They are pursued by Charlie's dipsomaniac father (Freddie Frinton).

Tony and his friends arrive at a Loch Ness inn, whose landlord Harry Sutton (Sid James) is trying to conceal dozens of poached salmon from two local policemen (Gordon Rollings and Terry Scott). Tony befriends the local postman (Wilfred Brambell) and other locals, who become more convinced the monster is real when they hear a monstrous roar from a speaker secretly installed by Vernon. The next day, the inn is swarming with customers and the press, much to the delight of Sutton and the locals.  However, the crowd's enthusiasm wanes when Tony is unable to produce a promised photo of the monster. In the midst of these events, Vernon and Charlie decide to get married, Marie falls for Tony, and the poached salmon are inadvertently loaded into a police car.

Tony and his friends secretly make another phony monster to photograph, only to discover that several locals, in an attempt to draw business and attention back to the area, had the same idea and made their own fake monsters. The locals also discover the hidden speaker Tony used to broadcast roars, and realize they were deceived all along. An angry mob chases Tony and Marie, who try to escape by rowing across the loch, only for the real monster to rise from the loch as the film ends.

Cast

 Adam Faith as Tony Blake
 Sid James as Harry Sutton
 Carole Lesley as Charlotte 'Charlie' Pinner
 Terence Longdon as Vernon
 Clive Dunn as Mr. Slate
 Freddie Frinton as Gilbert Pinner
 Marie-France as Marie
 Charles Hawtrey as Arnold
 Spike Milligan as Tramp
 Wilfrid Brambell as Postman
 Fabia Drake as Mrs. Pinner
 Harold Berens as Sammy
 Ewan Roberts as Jimmy
 Archie Duncan as Macdonald
 Terry Scott as Sergeant
 Anna Gilcrist as Grace
 Gordon Rollings as Doone
 Bernard Hunter as Legree
 Lloyd Reckord as Jojo
 Lance Percival as Policeman at Roundabout
 Molly Weir as Teacher
 Fyfe Robertson as Commentator
 J. Stevenson Lang as Crofter
 Alistair Hunter as 1st Scot
 Allan Casley as 2nd Scot
 Frank Forsyth as 3rd Scot

Background
Aspiring writer Jeremy Lloyd was working as a travelling salesman of rust-proof paint in the late 1950s when he wrote a story called 'What a Whopper' about a Cockney youth who runs tours to see the Loch Ness monster. After delivering paint near Pinewood Studios, he pitched the script to studio chief Earl St John, who bought it. Songwriter and actor Trevor Peacock provided ideas for the story and has an uncredited cameo as a barrow-boy. The script was reworked by Terry Nation. It was the first full film screenplay by Nation, who had started out writing for Spike Milligan, who has a cameo. What a Whopper displayed some of the strengths and flaws that would feature in Nation's subsequent television serials. Among the positives were his "ornate verbosity" (such as the postman's flowery description of the monster) and his tendency to add new complications at every opportunity, whereas the negatives included loose ends never being tied up (such as Tony's book disappearing from the story), and overt borrowing (such as the modern art parody being influenced by the recently released Tony Hancock film The Rebel).

References

External links

1961 films
1961 comedy films
Films directed by Gilbert Gunn
Films shot at Pinewood Studios
Loch Ness Monster in film
Films scored by Laurie Johnson
Films set in London
Films set in Scotland
British comedy films
Films with screenplays by Terry Nation
1960s English-language films
1960s British films